Naugatuck is a consolidated borough and town in New Haven County, Connecticut, United States. The town spans both sides of the Naugatuck River just south of Waterbury and includes the communities of Union City on the east side of the river, which has its own post office, Straitsville on the southeast (along Route 63), and Millville on the west (along Rubber Avenue). As of the 2020 census, Naugatuck had a population of 31,519.

History 

Naugatuck was settled in 1701 as a farming community in rural western Connecticut. As the Industrial Revolution commenced, Naugatuck was transformed into a mill town like its neighbors in the Naugatuck River Valley.

Rubber was the chief manufactured product. Charles Goodyear worked at his brother's rubber company, the Goodyear Metallic Rubber Shoe Company & Downtown Naugatuck, until the company was consolidated into the United States Rubber Company. The United States Rubber Company (renamed Uniroyal Inc. in 1961) was founded in Naugatuck in 1892 as a consolidation of nine rubber companies, and maintained their corporate headquarters there until the 1980s. Their footwear division manufactured Keds sneakers in Naugatuck from 1917 until the 1980s. U.S. Rubber also produced Naugahyde in a Naugatuck factory, but it is no longer produced there.

The United States Rubber Co. formed the Naugatuck Chemical Company on June 1, 1904 due to an increase in the price of sulfuric acid, which was needed for the process then used for reclaiming old rubber. The company was soon in the forefront of the chemical industry in the United States. Naugatuck Chemical remained a subsidiary of the U.S. Rubber Co. until it gained independence as Uniroyal Chemical Co. They moved their operations to Middlebury, Connecticut in the 1970s.

The Risdon Manufacturing Company was established in Naugatuck around 1910 producing safety pins. Risdon became the manufacturer of packaging for cosmetics and sewing items such as pins, needles, snaps, and other accessories. It is now the Crown Risdon Co., headquartered in Watertown, Connecticut.

In the 1960s, Harold Barber founded H. Barber and Sons in the community. The company builds beach rakes for picking up debris and grooming beaches and claims to be the largest such business in the world.

Naugatuck was the home to Peter Paul Candy Manufacturing Company, the Hershey Foods division that produces Almond Joy and Mounds candy bars, until the Hershey Co. closed it in November 2007.

The river cut a path of destruction that forever changed the face of Naugatuck.

Naugatuck High School has a storied football rivalry with the high school in Ansonia that is one of the longest in America. The two teams meet the morning of Thanksgiving Day, and the first meeting was in 1900. Ansonia is the long-term winner in the series.  Naugatuck High School's mascot is the greyhound, and its colors are garnet and grey.

Education 

Naugatuck has a total of 5 public elementary schools (which include grades K–4), 2 public intermediate schools (grades 5–6), 1 public middle school (grades 7–8), and 1 public high school (grades 9–12). The high school has an overall enrollment of 1,267 students and a graduation rate of 82%.

In 2013, an $81 million renovation for the high school took place and was completed by the fall of 2015 that brought the school up to date and back to mint condition.

Naugatuck High School was ranked 149th best in Connecticut.  This is near the bottom of all public high schools in Connecticut.   Although well funded, many years of mismanagement by the elected Board of Education, has led to this poor rating.  In recent years, a mostly new Board of Education and a new Superintendent has helped improve the quality of education in the school district.

Geography
According to the United States Census Bureau, the borough has a total area of 16.5 square miles (42.6 km), of which 16.4 square miles (42.4 km) is land and 0.1 square miles (0.2 km), or 0.36%, is water.

Government 
Naugatuck is unique in Connecticut government for being the only consolidated town and borough. Every other borough in Connecticut is a special services district located within another town, the unit of Connecticut local government. Naugatuck has both a town clerk and a borough clerk managing official records, the same as Connecticut cities having two clerks: a town clerk and a city clerk.

As with most other Connecticut towns and cities, Naugatuck elect its officials in November of odd-numbered years.

Transportation

The town has a Metro-North Railroad station (Naugatuck) along the Waterbury Branch of the New Haven Line. The principal highways through the town are Connecticut Route 63 (connecting to New Haven), Route 68 (leading to Durham), and the Route 8 expressway (for Waterbury, Derby, Torrington, and Bridgeport).

Demographics

As of the census of 2000, there were 30,989 people, 11,829 households, and 8,292 families residing in the borough. The racial makeup of the borough was 91.76% White, 2.85% Black or African American, 0.26% Native American, 1.68% Asian, 0.02% Pacific Islander, 1.58% from other races, and 1.85% from two or more races. Hispanic or Latino of any race were 4.47% of the population.

Of the 11,829 households, 36.3% of them had children under the age of 18 living with them, 53.3% were married couples living together, 12.8% had a female householder with no husband present, and 29.9% were non-families. 24.9% of all households were made up of individuals, and 9.6% had someone living alone who was 65 years of age or older.  The average household size was 2.60 and the average family size was 3.13.

In the borough, the population was spread out, with 26.9% under the age of 18, 7.3% from 18 to 24, 33.1% from 25 to 44, 21.0% from 45 to 64, and 11.7% who were 65 years of age or older.  The median age was 36 years. For every 100 females, there were 94.7 males.  For every 100 females age 18 and over, there were 90.5 males.

The median income for a household in the borough was $51,247, and the median income for a family was $59,286. Males had a median income of $42,103 versus $29,971 for females. The per capita income for the borough was $22,757.  About 0.9% of families and 1.4% of the population were below the poverty line, including 1.4% of those under age 18 and 6.0% of those age 65 or over.

On the National Register of Historic Places

 Bronson B. Tuttle House: 380 Church St., now headquarters of the Naugatuck Historical Society
 Naugatuck Center Historic District: Roughly bounded by Fairview Avenue, Hillside Avenue, Terrace Avenue, Water Street and Pleasant View Street (added August 30, 1999)
 Salem School: 124 Meadow St. (added December 3, 1983). Before construction of the first Naugatuck High School (now Hillside Intermediate School), high-school classes were held on the top floor of this building.
 United States Post Office–Naugatuck Main: Church and Cedar streets (added February 21, 1986)

Popular culture

In 2008, an episode of Food Paradise (Sandwich Paradise) on the Travel Channel highlighted the Nardelli's Grinder Shoppe and its specialty Italian grinder sandwiches ("Meat Combo"). The town has also been used as a filming location for works such as Engine Trouble, released in 2002, and War of the Worlds, filmed at the former Uniroyal plant and released in 2005. (The plant was demolished on February 28, 2008.)

Notable people

 Adrian, costume designer for Hollywood films such as The Wizard of Oz and the Broadway musical Camelot, for which he won a posthumous Tony Award
 Michael Bergin, former Calvin Klein model and Baywatch actor; attended Naugatuck High School where he played baseball and basketball
 Seth Bingham, organist and prolific composer
Emily Sophie Brown, one of the first women to serve in the Connecticut House of Representatives; resident of Naugatuck from 1910 to 1985
 Billy Burke, professional golfer, winner of the 1931 U.S. Open
 Ray Foley, baseball player who appeared in two games for the 1928 New York Giants
 Charles Goodyear, first American to vulcanize rubber, lived in Naugatuck as a young man; his brother, Henry Goodyear, founded the Goodyear Metallic Rubber Shoe Company in Naugatuck that became part of the United States Rubber Company in 1892
 Shirley Grey, stage and movie actress during the 1920s and 1930s
 Robert Harper, computer scientist
 Mohamed Hrezi, runner who competed in the 2016 Summer Olympics in the marathon
 Frank "Spec" Shea, professional baseball player who pitched in 1947 World Series, nicknamed "The Naugatuck Nugget"

See also
 Gunntown Cemetery
 Hop Brook Lake
 Laurel Park Incorporated
 Naugatuck State Forest
 St. Hedwig Parish, Union City

Notes

External links

 Borough of Naugatuck official website
 Naugatuck Economic Development Commission
 Naugatuck Historical Society
 Howard Whittemore Memorial Library
 Naugatuck Arts Commission
 Macaroni Kid

 
Boroughs in Connecticut
Boroughs in New Haven County, Connecticut
Connecticut placenames of Native American origin
Towns in New Haven County, Connecticut
Greater Waterbury, Connecticut
Naugatuck River Valley
Towns in the New York metropolitan area
Towns in Connecticut